Ejike Asiegbu  is a Nigerian film actor and film director who once served as President of the Actors Guild of Nigeria. He was also previously appointed as personal assistant to former Biafran leader Odumegwu Ojukwu during the 1994 National Constitutional Conference in Abuja.

Education 
Ejike Asiegbu had his primary school education at Constitution Crescent Primary School in Aba, Abia State, Nigeria, but completed his primary school education at St. Mary’s Primary School in Lokoja, Kogi State.
After completing his primary school education, Ejike Asiegbu proceeded to Abdul Azeez Attah Memorial College, Okene in Kogi State, Nigeria, but completed his secondary school education at Christ the King College (CKC) in Onitsha, Anambra State, Nigeria in 1980.

After completing his secondary school education, Ejike Asiegbu proceeded to University of Port Harcourt in Rivers State, Nigeria and graduated with a Bachelor’s Degree in Theatre Arts in 1993.

Career 
Ejike Asiegbu joined the Nigerian movie industry (Nollywood) in 1996 and acted in his first movie “Silent Night” a movie that brought him to limelight.
He acts mostly in action movies along with Pete Edochie, Clem Ohameze, Kanayo O Kanayo and Kenneth Okonkwo.

Awards 
Ejike Asiegbu won several awards which include; *Best Actor of the Year at the Africa Magic Viewers Choice Awards,Best Actor in Nigeria at the City People Entertainment Awards,Best Actor in a Leading Role at the Best of Nollywood Awards andMost Prominent Actor in Nigeria at the Africa Movie Academy Awards.''

Personal life 
Ejike is married to Ogechi Asiegbu, and has four children, including Etochi Ejike Asiegbu.

Filmography 
Gossip Nation
The Wrong Money
Silent Whispers
Be My Val
Last Kiss
Silent Night
Executive Connection
Power Must Change Hands
The Wolves
Squad Twenty-Three
End of Money
The Barons
State of Emergency
Rituals
Oracle
Too Much Money
A Time to Die
Abuja Boys
Dirty Game
The Silent Baron

References

External links

Living people
Igbo male actors
Nigerian male film actors
Nigerian film directors
University of Port Harcourt alumni
20th-century Nigerian male actors
21st-century Nigerian male actors
Year of birth missing (living people)
Nigerian male television actors